Ophidiaster is a genus of echinoderms belonging to the family Ophidiasteridae.

The genus has almost cosmopolitan distribution.

Species:

Ophidiaster agassizi 
Ophidiaster alexandri 
Ophidiaster arenatus 
Ophidiaster armatus 
Ophidiaster attenuatus 
Ophidiaster bayeri 
Ophidiaster bicolor 
Ophidiaster bullisi 
Ophidiaster chinensis 
Ophidiaster colossus 
Ophidiaster confertus 
Ophidiaster cribrarius 
Ophidiaster davidsoni 
Ophidiaster duncani 
Ophidiaster granifer 
Ophidiaster guildingi 
Ophidiaster helicostichus 
Ophidiaster hemprichi 
Ophidiaster kermadecensis 
Ophidiaster lorioli 
Ophidiaster ludwigi 
Ophidiaster macknighti 
Ophidiaster multispinus 
Ophidiaster ophidianus 
Ophidiaster perplexus 
Ophidiaster perrieri 
Ophidiaster reyssi 
Ophidiaster rhabdotus 
Ophidiaster tuberifer

References

Ophidiasteridae
Asteroidea genera